Ajay Kalahastri Naidu (born February 12, 1972) is an American actor best known for playing Samir in Office Space. Naidu was nominated for the Independent Spirit Award for Best Supporting Male for his performance in the film SubUrbia.

Early life and education
Naidu was born in Evanston, Illinois. His parents came from India to the United States in 1964. He attended Evanston Township High School. He trained with the American Repertory Theater's Institute for Advanced Theater Training at Harvard University.

Career
Naidu's first professional acting job, which he won from an open call, was a leading role opposite Michael Keaton in the 1986 film Touch and Go. This was followed by an ABC Afterschool Special episode, "No Greater Gift" (1985), where he played Nick Santana, a 12-year-old boy with a terminal illness. Naidu then appeared in the MacGyver TV series' first-season episode, "To Be a Man" in 1986.

Other early film credits include Where the River Runs Black (1986) opposite Charles Durning and Vice Versa (1988). Between 1988 and 1995 he worked extensively in classical theatre.

Naidu returned to film acting in 1996 with Richard Linklater's SubUrbia, for which he was nominated for the Independent Spirit Award for Best Supporting Male and competed against the likes of Samuel L. Jackson, Roy Scheider and Jason Lee.

On screen, Naidu starred in the cult film Office Space, as well as appearing in films such as K-Pax, Subway Stories, π, Requiem for a Dream, Bad Santa, The War Within, The Guru, Waterborne, and Loins of Punjab Presents. He co-starred as a series regular in the sitcom LateLine and had guest starring roles on the television dramas The Sopranos, The West Wing and Bored to Death.

Naidu has been working extensively with musicians from the Asian underground music movement for many years as a breakdancer and an M.C. His vocals have appeared on many records, most notably Talvin Singh's mercury award winner "OK".

In 2006, Naidu directed his first feature film Ashes which had its release in 2010 and for which he won Best Actor accolades from the MIACC Film Festival in New York and the London Asian Film Festival. 

Naidu's most recent theatre credits include The Kid Stays in the Picture at the Royal Court Theatre, The Master and Margarita with Complicite, a world tour of Shakespeare's Measure for Measure with Complicite, The Resistible Rise of Arturo Ui alongside Al Pacino, directed by Simon McBurney and The Little Flower of East Orange alongside Ellyn Burstyn at New York's Public Theater directed by Philip Seymour Hoffman. In 2001 Naidu's solo theatre piece Darwaza was a sold-out hit at New York's Labyrinth Theatre, where he is also a member of the company.

In 2019, Naidu was awarded the Excellence in Performing Arts Award by Illinois Secretary of State Jesse White.

Personal life
Naidu is married to actress Heather Burns. The couple has a son, Jaan Burns.

Filmography

Film

Television

References

External links
 Ajay Naidu on Diversity in Hollywood and His Roller Coaster Ride from Child Actor to ‘Office Space’ Icon on Film School Rejects
 An Interview with Ajay Naidu on Closely Observed Frames
 Ajay Naidu: Taking Up the Slack on Backstage
 In What Language? An Interview with Ajay Naidu on Asia Society
 

1972 births
Living people
Male actors from Evanston, Illinois
American male film actors
American male television actors
American male voice actors
Institute for Advanced Theater Training, Harvard University alumni
Evanston Township High School alumni
American male actors of Indian descent